Dimitar Panayotov Grekov (14 September 1847 – 7 May 1901) was a leading Bulgarian liberal politician who also served as Prime Minister. 

A native of Bolgrad in Bessarabia (now Bolhrad, Ukraine), Grekov was educated at a French legal school.

Grekov, at the time a Conservative, was a member of the Bulgarian Constitutional Assembly convened in February 1879, a body that formed the basis of the national parliament of the newly independent state. In the 1879 cabinet of Todor Burmov he served as Minister of Justice, the first of an independent Bulgaria.

In 1886 prime minister and regent Stefan Stambolov chose Grekov, along with Konstantin Kanchev and Konstantin Stoilov, to travel around Europe in order to find a prince suitable for the throne of Bulgaria. The three man team searched in Belgrade and Vienna and were refused entry into Russia before settling on Ferdinand of Saxe-Coburg-Gotha, to whom they offered the crown.

Grekov was appointed prime minister on 30 January 1899 and was removed from office on 13 October that same year after a brief and unremarkable tenure.

References

1847 births
1901 deaths
Chairpersons of the National Assembly of Bulgaria
People from Bolhrad
Bessarabian Bulgarians
Conservative Party (Bulgaria) politicians
People's Liberal Party politicians
Prime Ministers of Bulgaria
19th-century Bulgarian people
Members of the Bulgarian Academy of Sciences
Justice ministers of Bulgaria